Frazier River was an American country music group formed in Cincinnati, Ohio in 1991 and disbanded in 1996. The group consisted of lead singer Danny Frazier and five musicians, Chuck Adair, Greg Amburgy, Brian "Gigs" Baverman, Jim Morris and Bob Wilson. Frazier River recorded one album for Decca Records Nashville and released three singles, two of which charted on the Billboard Hot Country Singles & Tracks (now Hot Country Songs) charts.

History
Frazier River was founded in 1991 in Cincinnati, Ohio by Danny Frazier (lead vocals, guitar), Chuck Adair (guitar), Greg Amburgy (keyboards, guitars, background vocals), Brian "Gigs" Baverman (drums), Jim Morris (keyboards, background vocals) and Bob Wilson (background vocals, bass guitar). They signed to Decca Records Nashville in 1996 and released a self-titled debut album for the label. This album produced two chart singles on the Billboard country charts: "She Got What She Deserves" at number 57 and "Tangled Up in Texas" at number 67. Country Standard Time critic Robert Loy gave a mostly favorable review of the album, comparing Frazier's "almost operatic" voice to that of Gary Morris and saying that his "voice even rescues lesser songs" on the album. He cited "Last Request" and "Heaven Is Smiling" as standout tracks. After Frazier River disbanded, Frazier, Morris and Baverman founded a second band called the Danny Frazier Band, with Chris Goins and Jerry Owen.

Frazier River (1996)

Track listing
"Everything About You" (Jim Daddario, Greg Barnhill) – 4:32
"That's Why I'm Here" (Bill Luther) – 3:26
"Money Don't Make People" (Ronnie Rogers, Mark Wright) – 2:38
"She Got What She Deserves" (Jenny Yates, Bobby Fischer, Charlie Black) – 2:58
"Last Request" (Mark Alan Springer, A. J. Masters) – 3:42
"I Don't Want to See You Again" (Jackson Leap) – 3:37
"Tangled Up in Texas" (Dennis Morgan, Billy Burnette, Larry Henley) – 3:28
"Birmingham Steel" (John Brannen, Alex Harvey) - 3:10
"Heaven Is Smiling" (Rick Crawford, Brian Tankersley, Morgan Cryer) – 4:12
"It Won't Bring Her Back" (Jimmy Webb) – 3:43

Personnel

Frazier River
Chuck Adair – guitars
Greg Amburgy – background vocals, keyboards, guitars
Brian "Gigs" Baverman – drums
Danny Frazier – lead vocals, guitars
Jim Morris – background vocals, keyboards
Bob Wilson – background vocals, bass guitar

Additional musicians
Bruce Bouton – steel guitar
J. T. Corenflos – guitars
Chad Cromwell – drums
B. James Lowry – guitars
Duncan Mullins – bass guitar
Steve Nathan – keyboards
Brent Rowan – guitars
Biff Watson – guitars

Singles

Music videos

References

External links
Danny Frazier

American country music groups
Musical groups established in 1991
Musical groups from Cincinnati
Decca Records artists
Musical groups disestablished in 1996
1991 establishments in Ohio